Tibor Minczér born 23 June 1984 in Nyíregyháza) is a Hungarian football player who currently plays for Várda SE.

References

1984 births
Living people
People from Nyíregyháza
Hungarian footballers
Association football midfielders
Nyíregyháza Spartacus FC players
Hajdúböszörményi TE footballers
Nemzeti Bajnokság I players
Kisvárda FC players
Sportspeople from Szabolcs-Szatmár-Bereg County